The following elections occurred in the year 1917.

Europe
 1917 Dutch general election
 1917 Finnish parliamentary election
 1917 Russian Constituent Assembly election
 1917 Sfatul Țării election
 1917 Swedish general election

United Kingdom
 1917 Henley by-election
 1917 Liverpool Abercromby by-election
 1917 Rossendale by-election
 1917 Southampton by-election
 1917 Stockton-on-Tees by-election
 1917 Wisbech by-election

America

Bolivia
 José Gutiérrez Guerra is elected President of Bolivia (predecessor: Ismael Montes Gamboa)

Canada
 1917 Canadian federal election
 1917 Alberta general election
 1917 Edmonton municipal election
 1917 New Brunswick general election
 1917 Saskatchewan general election
 1917 Toronto municipal election
 1917 Yukon general election

United States
 1917 New York City mayoral election
 1917 New York state election

Oceania

Australia
 1917 Australian federal election
 1917 Australian conscription referendum
 1917 Western Australian state election

New Zealand
 1917 Bay of Islands by-election
 1917 Grey by-election
 1917 Hawkes Bay by-election

See also
 :Category:1917 elections

1917
Elections